Dacia Ripensis was the name of a Roman province in the northern Balkan peninsula, immediately south of the Middle Danube. Its capital was Ratiaria (modern Archar, Bulgaria). It was a district less urban than neighbouring Dacia Mediterranea and more militarized; "military camps and forts, rather than cities, were typical of the province". Besides Ratiaria, Oescus was the major settlement.

Dacia Ripensis was one of the "Two Dacias" established south of the Danube in the late 3rd century. The Roman emperor Aurelian abandoned the province of Roman Dacia established by Trajan in 106 AD on the northern bank of the river, and created the two new "Dacias" between the existing provinces of Moesia Prima (upstream) and Moesia Secunda (downstream). The northern part of Aurelian's Dacia Aureliana is attested as "Dacia Ripensis" in 343/4. The southern part, with its capital at Serdica (modern Sofia) was known as Dacia Mediterranea.

According to the Laterculus Veronensis, both provinces were part of the Diocese of Moesiae after the empire was divided into dioeceses during the reign of Constantine the Great, but by the time of the Notitia Dignitatum they were part of the Diocese of Thrace. According to the Notitia, Dacia Ripensis was governed by a praeses, while the governor of Dacia Mediterranea was a more senior consularis. Dacia Ripensis was under the authority of the Praetorian prefecture of Illyricum.

Dacia Ripensis flourished in the mid-4th century, and some forts on the northern bank of the Danube were recovered by the Romans. In the 5th century Priscus described Ratiaria as large and densely populated.

In 535, emperor Justinian I (527-565) created the Archbishopric of Justiniana Prima as a regional primacy with ecclesiastical jurisdiction over all provinces of the Diocese of Dacia, including the province of Dacia Ripensis.

History
It is unclear whether Aurelian or the Emperor Diocletian replaced Dacia Aureliana with two provinces, but by 285, there were two – Dacia Mediterranea with its capital at Serdica and Dacia Ripensis, with its capital at Ratiaria. Later, these two "Dacias" along with Dardania, Lower Moesia, and Prevalitana constituted the Diocese of Dacia.

Ratiaria was established as the capital of Dacia Ripensis (it was previously a colony founded by Trajan located within Moesia Superior) and served both as the seat of the military governor (or dux) and as the military base for the Roman legion XIII Gemina.

According to Priscus, Dacia Ripensis was a flourishing province during the 4th and 5th centuries AD. During the early 440s, however, the Huns captured the province (prior to this, there were conflicts between the Romans and the Huns whereby the latter group captured Castra Martis through treacherous means). Even though the province recovered briefly from Hunnic rule, it was eventually decimated by the Avars in 586. On a more specific note, Aurelian developed Dacia Ripensis on a stretch of the Danube specifically between Moesia Superior and Moesia Inferior.

Famous individuals
Aurelian, Roman emperor from 270 to 275, was probably born in Dacia Ripensis, at that time still named Moesia.
   Roman Emperor Galerius was born in Dacia Ripensis.
   Palladius of Ratiaria, late 4th century Arian Christian theologian.
 Constantius Chlorus, Roman emperor from 293 to 306, born in Dacia Ripensis, .

See also
 Dacia
 Roman Dacia
 List of ancient cities in Thrace and Dacia

References

Sources

 

 

 
Roman Dacia
Late Roman provinces
Former populated places in the Balkans
Former populated places in Eastern Europe
Praetorian prefecture of Illyricum
280s establishments in the Roman Empire
280s establishments
586 disestablishments
580s disestablishments in the Byzantine Empire
States and territories disestablished in the 580s
Bulgaria in the Roman era
Serbia in the Roman era